Darko Božović (Cyrillic: Дарко Божовић; born 9 August 1978) is a Montenegrin retired footballer, who played as a goalkeeper.

Club career
On 28 October 2006, while playing for Bežanija, Božović scored an equalizer in their home league fixture against Voždovac. Firstly, on the 0–1 result, he defended a penalty by Miloš Kolaković in the 88th minute, and then, in the fourth minute of injury time, he scored a header from a corner kick for the final 1–1.

In June 2007, Božović moved to Partizan, playing regularly for the team in the first six months. However, he lost his place in the starting eleven in the second half of the 2007–08 season to his fellow countryman Mladen Božović, who arrived at the club in the 2008 winter transfer window. In the summer of 2010, Božović was released by the club after receiving very little playing time in the previous two years.

In August 2013, Božović joined Hong Kong First Division side Happy Valley. On 5 January 2014, he was one of the seven players and coaching staff arrested by the Hong Kong Independent Commission Against Corruption (ICAC) for allegations with match-fixing. On 6 January 2014, the homes of Božović and five other Happy Valley players were raided by the ICAC as the officials stepped up their investigation into alleged match-fixing. Božović was later released without charge, although his teammates Hinson Leung and Saša Mus were jailed for 12 months for match-fixing in 2014. On 26 March 2014, Božović and other Happy Valley players went to the Hong Kong Labour Department to make claims against Happy Valley for unpaid and outstanding wages worth around 100,000 Hong Kong dollars.

After leaving Happy Valley in Hong Kong, Božović returned to Serbia and joined  Superlige-side FK Voždovac in July 2014.

International career
Božović made his debut for Montenegro in a September 2007 friendly match against Sweden and has earned a total of 2 caps, scoring no goals. His second and final international was another friendly, a month later against Estonia.

Honours
Bežanija
 Serbian First League: 2005–06

Partizan
 Serbian SuperLiga: 2007–08, 2008–09, 2009–10
 Serbian Cup: 2007–08, 2008–09

References

External links

 
 

1978 births
Living people
Footballers from Podgorica
Association football goalkeepers
Serbia and Montenegro footballers
Montenegrin footballers
Montenegro international footballers
FK Teleoptik players
FK Srem players
OFK Mladenovac players
FK Timok players
FK Bežanija players
FK Partizan players
FK Sloboda Užice players
Zob Ahan Esfahan F.C. players
Happy Valley AA players
FK Voždovac players
Second League of Serbia and Montenegro players
Serbian SuperLiga players
Persian Gulf Pro League players
Serbian First League players
Hong Kong First Division League players
Montenegrin expatriate footballers
Expatriate footballers in Iran
Montenegrin expatriate sportspeople in Iran
Expatriate footballers in Hong Kong
Montenegrin expatriate sportspeople in Hong Kong